Nephthytis is a genus of eight species of flowering plants in the family Araceae, native to tropical western Africa, with one species in Borneo.

They are herbaceous plants growing from a rhizome. The leaves are evergreen, light and dark green, 15–35 cm long, and are usually arrowhead-shaped, with three lobes. The leaf shape can vary depending on the age of the plant.

Cultivation 
Some species are popular houseplants. If so, they must be kept away from any pets, as they are poisonous. When grown indoors as a decorative houseplant, it needs frequent watering to keep the soil moist. It prefers temperatures that are comfortable to humans, as with most plants. It functions well as a hanging or terrarium plant. The most common of its problems is root rot and can be avoided by providing adequate drainage. This can also be caused by allowing the plant to sit in water. As for other problems, scale insects can also affect it. If this happens, scrape them off and isolate the plant. For this kind of problem, pesticides and sprays do not always work as the shell of the insect protects it. If this becomes a severe problem, you will have to get rid of the plant.  Also if this happens, make sure it is moved away from any other surrounding plants because the bugs could infect them as well. Other than that, this plant is very easy to take care of and thus, it is good for beginners. Propagation of Nephthytis is fairly easy as well. It can be propagated by layering and from cuttings.

Certain Nephthytis species are poisonous to cats and dogs. Symptoms are oral irritation and vomiting.

Syngonium podophyllum 
An unrelated American species, Syngonium podophyllum, commonly grown as a houseplant, was originally confused with the similar-looking Nephthytis.  It still retains Nephthytis as a common name, though it was given its own genus in 1879.

Species
Species recognized by the World Checklist of Selected Plant Families:
 Nephthytis afzelii Schott - West Africa from Congo-Brazzaville to Sierra Leone
 Nephthytis bintuluensis A.Hay, Bogner & P.C.Boyce - Sarawak
 Nephthytis hallaei Bogner - Gabon
 Nephthytis mayombensis de Namur & Bogner - Congo-Brazzaville 
 Nephthytis poissonii (Engl.) N.E.Br. - Congo-Brazzaville, Gulf of Guinea Islands, Gabon, Cameroon, Nigeria 
 Nephthytis swainei Bogner - Ivory Coast, Ghana, Congo-Brazzaville, Gabon, Cameroon

References

External links

 International Aroid Society search

Aroideae
Araceae genera
House plants